Lohar Nangal is a village in Nakodar in Jalandhar district of Punjab State, India. The village is administrated by a sarpanch who is an elected representative of village as per Panchayati raj (India).

Transport 
Nakodar railway station is the nearest train station.

References 

Villages in Jalandhar district
Villages in Nakodar tehsil